「ネガとポジ」(Nega to Poji) is the fourteenth album by the Japanese rock group Plastic Tree.

Track listing

Plastic Tree albums
2007 albums